The Andh are a designated Scheduled Tribe in the Indian states of Maharashtra, Telangana and Andhra Pradesh. Andhs have the originated from the Satavahan dynasty.Andh community is one of the oldest Hindu community in India  At the time of Satvahan rule,  the king was the owner of the lands and the forests but some time after the death of the Satvahan king, the East India Company decreed all lands and forests under their governance. This was the cause of the Andh becoming isolated and non-progressed. They seem to have is originated in southern India in the vicinity of Madras which was once ruled by the Andhra dynasty. However the identification is only used for the people who by the start of the 20th century had a long history of presence in central India. 

The Andh are the original descendants of the Andhra dynasty or Satvahana dynasty that ruled between third century BC to second century AD. At the time of Nijamshah of Hyderabad, before the marathwada region were isolated, Andh are the ruling satvahan dynastry, but after the attack of Nijamshah on this region Satvahan dynasty collapsed due to the death of the king and region had to be taken into 'Hyderabad Sansthan'. After this massive loss the Andh agreed to live as a tribe.
≠
The Andhs live primarily in the hills of the Adilabad district in Telangana.  They are further subdivided into the Vertali and the Khaltali.  The Vertali consider themselves a superior people and avoid marrying the  Khaltali. "It seems highly possible that the word Andh is only a corruption of the Sanskrit 'Andhra', a designation given by the ancient Aryans to an aboriginal tribe dwelling in the Andhra Desh " (Wilson, V.P. 190). 
Similarly Andhs too speak Marathi. The Sanskrit word Andh is Andhr. The Satavahana clan of Andhras is said to have established first ever empire in entire Deccan two thousand years ago at Kotilingala, Jagtial district. Their inscriptions were in Maharashtri variant of Prakrit language, majority scholars say. Even today, the Andhs living in Telangana (across erstwhile Adilabad district) speak Marathi. Therefore, it can be surmised that Marathi also has its origins in Telangana.

In Maharashtra the Andh comprise 474110 population (census 2011). Andh are distributed in Parbhani, Nanded,  Yeotmal, Akola districts mainly. They called themselves Hindu and are relatively well progressed in education.

According to the Anthropological Survey of India, there are over 74,000 Andhs in Maharashtra. These Andhs speak Telugu, Marathi. The Andhs are primarily Hindus. In, Andhra Pradesh, Telangana About 100,000 Andh speak the Telugu.

Sources

https://web.archive.org/web/20110721155405/http://www.aptribes.gov.in/html/tcr-studies-eci-andh.htm

Scheduled Tribes of Andhra Pradesh
Scheduled Tribes of Maharashtra